Atex or ATEX may refer to:

 ATEX directive, either of two EU directives for safety requirements in explosive atmospheres
 Atex (software), a software company.